The 2012–13 Tijuana season was the 66th professional season of Mexico's top-flight football league. The season is split into two tournaments—the Torneo Apertura and the Torneo Clausura—each with identical formats and each contested by the same eighteen teams. Tijuana began their season on July 20, 2012 against Puebla, Tijuana played most of their homes games on Fridays at 5:30pm local time in the Apertura season and at 5PM local time in the Clausura season. On December 2, 2012, Tijuana defeated Toluca 2–0 (4–1 on aggregate) to win their first Liga MX title. Tijuana did not qualify to the final phase in the Clausura tournament and were eliminated by Atlético Mineiro in the quarter-finals of the Copa Libertadores.

Torneo Apertura

Squad

 (Captain)

Regular season

Apertura 2012 results

Final phase

Tijuana advanced 2–1 on aggregate

Tijuana advanced 3–2 on aggregate

Tijuana won 4–1 on aggregate

Tijuana won their first title in history

Goalscorers

Regular season

Source:

Final phase

Results

Results summary

Results by round

Copa MX

Group stage

Apertura results

Knockout stage

Goalscorers

Results

Results by round

Torneo Clausura

Squad

 (Captain)

Regular season

Clausura 2013 results

Tijuana did not qualify to the Final Phase

Goalscorers

Results

Results summary

Results by round

Copa Libertadores

Group 5

Second stage

Copa Libertadores results

Knockout stage

Tijuana won on points 4–1.

Tied on points 2–2, Atlético Mineiro won on away goals.

Goalscorers

Results

Results summary

Results by round

References

Mexican football clubs 2012–13 season